Oncidium dichromaticum is a species of orchid native to 20 - 1500 m altitude of the Andes Mountains region of Colombia, Costa Rica, and Panama.

References 

dichromaticum
Flora of Colombia
Flora of Costa Rica
Flora of Panama